Baptist High School, often abbreviated as BHS, is a prominent all-boys secondary school in Nigeria. The school is located in the Borokiri neighbourhood of Port Harcourt, Rivers State and was founded in the late 1940s.

BHS was among the mission schools taken over by the military government after the civil war. It was returned to the Baptist Mission in 2006 in compliance with the Rivers State Education (Return of Schools) law, 2005.

Notable alumni
Since its establishment, Baptist High School has
produced well known leaders and personalities; including:
DJ Abass, businessman
Otelemaba Amachree, politician
Nimi Briggs, former vice-chancellor of the University of Port Harcourt
Reynolds Bekinbo Dagogo-Jack, civil engineer, technocrat, public servant and politician.
Boma Iyaye, accountant
Magnus L. Kpakol, renowned economist
Walter Ofonagoro, scholar, politician, businessman, Minister of Information and Culture
Clem Ohameze, actor
Okey Wali, lawyer, 26th president of the Nigerian Bar Association
Patrick Dele Cole  Diplomat and Administrator
Israel Dinne Ubani -Former Permanent Secretary Abia State
Herbert I Onyewuchi Ex Rector Federal Polytechnic Nekede Owerri

References

Schools in Port Harcourt
Secondary schools in Rivers State
Educational institutions established in the 1940s
Boys' schools in Rivers State
1940s establishments in Rivers State
Baptist schools in Nigeria